Bredebrae ("Broad Glacier"), sometimes also known as "Brede Glacier", is a large glacier in northeastern Greenland. It has its terminus on the east coast of the Greenland ice sheet.

Geography
The mighty Bredebrae is the front or the confluence of two very large glaciers, the Storstrommen flowing from the north and the L. Bistrup Brae from the south. 

Bredebrae is a broad glacier producing masses of large icebergs with its terminus to the north and west of Lindhard Island at the head of Borge Fjord, west of Dove Bay, Greenland Sea. A huge amount of ice constantly drifts out of the fjord from the glacier, completely clogging the entrance of the fjord with multitude of irregularly-shaped icebergs.

See also
List of glaciers in Greenland

References

External links
Weather in Bredebræ (Ostgronland), Greenland
CHRONIQUE GÉOGRAPHIQUE (French)
Glaciers of Greenland